The 2016 Aegon Classic Birmingham was a women's tennis tournament played on outdoor grass courts. It was the 35th edition of the event, and a Premier tournament on the 2016 WTA Tour. It took place at the Edgbaston Priory Club in Birmingham, England, from 13 June until 19 June 2016. Seventh-seeded Madison Keys won the singles title.

Points and prize money

Point distribution

Prize money

Singles main draw entrants

Seeds

1rankings as of June 6, 2016

Other entrants
The following players received wildcards into the main draw:
  Naomi Broady
  Petra Kvitová
  Tara Moore
  Agnieszka Radwańska

The following players received entry from the qualifying draw:
  Christina McHale
  Tamira Paszek
  Tsvetana Pironkova
  Kateřina Siniaková

The following player received entry as a lucky loser:
  Magda Linette

Withdrawals
Before the tournament
  Dominika Cibulková → replaced by  Heather Watson
  Simona Halep → replaced by  Magda Linette
  Svetlana Kuznetsova → replaced by  Camila Giorgi

Retirements
  Belinda Bencic (right thigh injury)

Doubles main draw entrants

Seeds

1 Rankings as of June 6, 2016.

Other entrants
The following pairs received wildcards into the doubles main draw:
  Belinda Bencic /  Andrea Petkovic
  Naomi Broady /  Heather Watson
  Johanna Konta /  Elina Svitolina

The following pair received entry as alternates:
  Misaki Doi /  Kurumi Nara

Withdrawals
Before the tournament
  Belinda Bencic (right thigh injury)

Finals

Singles

  Madison Keys defeated  Barbora Strýcová, 6–3, 6–4

Doubles

  Karolína Plíšková /  Barbora Strýcová defeated  Vania King /  Alla Kudryavtseva, 6–3, 7–6(7–1)

References

http://www.lta.org.uk/major-events/aegon-classic-birmingham/aegon-classic-news/

External links
 

2016 WTA Tour
2016
2016 in English tennis